The New South Wales Court of Appeal, part of the Supreme Court of New South Wales, is the highest court for civil matters and has appellate jurisdiction in the Australian state of New South Wales.

Jurisdiction
The Court hears appeals from a variety of courts and tribunals in New South Wales, in particular the Supreme Court, the Industrial Court, the Land and Environment Court, the District Court, the Dust Diseases Tribunal, the Workers Compensation Commission, and the Government and Related Employees Appeal Tribunal. The Court of Appeal must grant leave to appeal a judgment of an inferior court, before it hears the appeal proper.

If a petitioner is not satisfied with the decision made by the Court of Appeal, application may be made to the High Court of Australia for special leave to appeal the decision before the High Court. Because special leave is only granted by the High Court under certain conditions, the Court of Appeal is in effect a court of final appeal for many matters.

History
The Court of Appeal was established in 1965, replacing the former appellate Full Court of the New South Wales Supreme Court, and commenced operations on 1 January 1966 with the appointment of the President, Sir Gordon Wallace, and six Judges of Appeal, Bernard Sugerman, Charles McLelland, Cyril Walsh, Kenneth Jacobs, Kenneth Asprey and John Holmes Dashwood. The advent of the Court of Appeal was controversial, as it introduced another order and unexpectedly uprooted the established order of hierarchy and seniority among judges of the Supreme Court.

Current Composition
The Court of Appeal, consists of the Chief Justice of New South Wales, the President of the Court of Appeal and the judges of appeal. Apart from the Chief Justice and the President of the Court, there are ten judges of appeal with current commissions.  Traditionally two of them are heads of the Common Law Division and the Equity Division, and sit full-time in those Divisions as primary judges. The Chief Judge at Common Law is currently Robert Beech-Jones, while the Chief Judge at Equity is currently David Hammerschlag. The chief judges will on occasion sit as appeal judges from time to time.

The Governor can appoint Acting Judges of Appeal. They have all rights and powers as a Judge of Appeal.  There is presently one acting judge of appeal, Carolyn Simpson.  Each sit full-time in the Court of Appeal, although will hear primary cases in the Divisions as the need arises.

Most judges in the Court of Appeal also sit on the Court of Criminal Appeal in varying degrees of frequency. The Chief Judge at Common Law and the Chief Judge in Equity also sit on the Court of Appeal (and the Court of Criminal Appeal) from time to time.

Presidents of the Court of Appeal

See also

List of New South Wales courts and tribunals
List of judges of appeal of the NSW Court of Appeal

References

External links
 Supreme Court website
 Court of Appeal Judgments (Caselaw NSW)
 

New South Wales
New South Wales courts and tribunals
Courts and tribunals established in 1966
1966 establishments in Australia